The Veldrit Pijnacker was a cyclo-cross race held in Pijnacker, Netherlands and was a part of the UCI Cyclo-cross World Cup from the 2003–2004 season until the 2008–2009 season. After being thrown out of the World Cup, according to the UCI for economical reasons, the organisers decided to stop holding the race.

Past winners

References

UCI Cyclo-cross World Cup
Cyclo-cross races
Defunct cycling races in the Netherlands
Recurring sporting events established in 1999
1999 establishments in the Netherlands
Recurring sporting events disestablished in 2008
2008 disestablishments in the Netherlands
Cycling in South Holland
Sport in Pijnacker-Nootdorp